is a Japanese classical guitarist. She is the first Japanese artist to have signed an exclusive international contract with Decca Music Group.

Biography 
Muraji learned to play the guitar from the age of 3 on. First she was taught by her father and from the age of ten by the guitarist Shinichi Fukuda. In the early 1990s she won several guitar competition in Japan and in 1993 gave her debut recital in the Tsuda Hall. In the same year she published with Espressivo her first album and in the following she had her Orchestra debut with the Japan Philharmonic Orchestra.

In 1997 she moved to Europe to study under Alberto Ponce at the Ecole Normale de Musique in Paris. After her graduation 1999 she moved back to Japan.

Discography
Espressivo
Kaori Muraji, guitar
21 October 1993: Victor Entertainment
GREEN SLEEVES
Kaori Muraji, guitar
21 January 1995: Victor Entertainment
sinfonia
Kaori Muraji, guitar
24 July 1996: Victor Entertainment
Pastorale
Kaori Muraji, guitar
21 November 1997: Victor Entertainment
CAVATINA
Kaori Muraji, guitar
21 November 1998: Victor Entertainment
Concierto de Aranjuez
Kaori Muraji, guitar
Kazufumi Yamashita, conductor
New Japan Philharmonic
23 March 2000: Victor Entertainment
Resplandor De La Guitarra
Kaori Muraji, guitar
Orquesta de Cámara Joaquín Rodrigo
24 April 2002: Victor Entertainment
LA ESTELLA
Kaori Muraji, guitar
21 February 2004: Victor Entertainment
Transformations
Kaori Muraji, guitar
Dominic Miller, guitar
21 July 2004 (Japanese Release)
March, 2005 (International Release): Decca Music Group
Spain
Kaori Muraji, guitar
21 October 2005: Victor Entertainment
lumières
Kaori Muraji, guitar
26 October 2005 (Japanese Release)
February, 2006 (International Release): Decca Music Group
Lyre & Sonnet/Into the Light
Kaori Muraji, guitar
The Sixteen, choir
Harry Christophers, conductor
25 October 2006 (Japanese Release)
Spring, 2007 (International Release): Decca Music Group
Amanda
Kaori Muraji, guitar
Michiru Oshima, conductor
ORCHESTRE DES VIRTUOSES DE PARIS
25 April 2007 (Japanese Release)
Kaori Muraji plays Bach
Kaori Muraji, guitar
Christian Funke, conductor
Bachorchester, Leipzig
1 January 2008 
Viva! Rodrigo
Kaori Muraji, guitar
Victor Pablo Pérez, conductor
Orquesta Sinfónica de Galicia
4 February 2008: Decca Music Group
Portrait
Kaori Muraji, guitar
5 April 2010: Decca Music Group
Rhapsody Japan
Kaori Muraji, guitar
26 October 2016
Soleil - Portraits 2
Kaori Muraji, guitar
Soichi Muraji, guitar
26 Octrober 2016
Cinema - Movie Themes For Classical Guitar
Kaori Muraji, guitar
Soichi Muraji, guitar
22 March 2019

External links
Kaori Muraji official homepage 
Decca Music Group - Kaori Muraji

References 

1978 births
Living people
Musicians from Tokyo
École Normale de Musique de Paris alumni
Japanese classical guitarists
Women classical guitarists
21st-century guitarists
21st-century women guitarists